Wikstroemia linoides is a shrub in the family Thymelaeaceae.  It is native to China, specifically Hubei, Shaanxi, and Sichuan.

Description
The shrub grows from 0.3 to 0.9 m tall. Its branches are slender. Its flowers and berries are yellow.  It can be found on hillsides at altitudes of 680 to 1600 m.

References

linoides